Vittoria Di Silverio, also known as Maria Vittoria Ghirighini, was an Italian film, television, and stage actress. She was best known for her roles in films such as L'homme orchestre (1969) and The Conquest of the Citadel (1977).

Biography
Di Silverio's career in stage acting began in 1917. Once spotted, this was followed by many appearances on Italian television, from the mid-1950s until the early 1980s, with her final public appearance at the Taormina Film Fest in 1993. She was the mother of actor, stuntman, and model Biagio Gambini (1926–1986), grandmother of actress Nella Gambini (1953–2016) and aunt of the actor Luciano Catenacci (1933–1990) and actress Francesca Romana Coluzzi (1943–2009).

References

External links
 

Italian film actresses
Italian stage actresses
Italian television actresses
1907 births

Year of death missing